Joseph Hutchinson (1852 – 23 October 1928) was an Irish politician. He was a member of the United Irish League. He was a member of Dublin Corporation from 1890 to 1913, and served two terms as Lord Mayor of Dublin from 1904 to 1906. In 1877, he founded the Irish National Foresters' Benefit Society. He was Sheriff of Dublin City in 1896. He is mentioned in James Joyce's Ulysses.

References

1852 births
1928 deaths
Lord Mayors of Dublin
People from County Laois
United Irish League people